Sågen is the centre of the Vendelsö-Gudö sub-district of Haninge, Sweden. It is a community mainly consisting of 4-story buildings, built in the 1970s.

It is a child-friendly area with many playgrounds and a nearby school. The residents of Sågen are proud of their surrounding large trees and wide lawns, a feature that distinguishes Sågen from other similar communities. It is built around a square (“the Sågen Square”) with multiple shops.

Sågen is situated near nature and forests. The surrounding area offers several lakes for swimming or skating, depending on the season.

Populated places in Haninge Municipality